The following is an incomplete list of sports venues that currently have or once had a highest attendance of 100,000 people or more. Included are also those venues which have closed, been refurbished, or have been proposed.

Current venues 
This list is for those venues that are currently open for use and have a permanent structure (open venues such as for marathons are not considered). Their highest attendance may have occurred at a time when the configuration of venue was different, through the use of standing sections, or the use of infield areas. In the case of AT&T Stadium, the highest attendance was recorded for a basketball game, which used field-level seating not available for the venue's standard American football configuration. The largest sporting venue in the world, the Indianapolis Motor Speedway, has a permanent seating capacity for more than 257,000 people and infield seating that raises capacity to an approximate 400,000. Also TPC Scottsdale during the Phoenix Open has the ability to hold 250,000 spectators in a single day, hosting 216,818 golf fans on February 3, 2018.

Closed, proposed, and expanding venues 
This list is for those venues that are currently closed, not in use, proposed, or are currently being expanded to 100,000 or more spectators.

See also
 Lists of stadiums

Notes

References

External links
100 000+ Stadiums current
100,000+ Stadiums closed

Lists of sports venues with capacity
Sporting venues